Louie Caporusso (born June 21, 1989) is a Canadian ice hockey player. He is currently playing under contract to the Cincinnati Cyclones of the ECHL. Caporusso was drafted by the Ottawa Senators in the 3rd round (90th overall) of the 2007 NHL Entry Draft.

Caporusso played from 2007 to 2011 with the University of Michigan Wolverines team. During the 2008–09 Michigan Wolverines men's ice hockey season, he was named to the All-Central Collegiate Hockey Association (CCHA) first team. He was also named first-team AHCA/Reebok Division I Ice Hockey All-American. He led the nation in goals scored for most of the 2008–09 NCAA Division I men's ice hockey season. During the 2009–10 Michigan Wolverines men's ice hockey season, he was named to the CCHA All-tournament team as he led the team to the championship. Prior to his time at the University of Michigan, he excelled in junior hockey in Ontario, Canada, which earned him a position as a draftee by the Ottawa Senators of the National Hockey League before entering college. After finishing his senior season, Caporusso signed with the Senators on May 30, 2011.

Playing career

Junior
During the 2004–05 season, he played in the Greater Toronto Hockey League (GTHL) for the Toronto Red Wings, recording 70 points including 41 goals in 56 games. The 70-point total made him the GTHL point leader for the season.

After his league leading performance, he was drafted by the Toronto St. Michael's Majors of the Ontario Hockey League with the seventh selection of the tenth round, but instead of playing for them, he spent the following two seasons playing in the Ontario Junior Hockey League (OPJHL) for the St. Michael's Buzzers. During the 2005–06 season, he led the OPJHL in scoring with 73 points in 48 games and led the team to the OPJHL championship. Caporusso scored 50 points in 37 games during the 2006–07 season, but the team lost in the finals. Following the season, he was drafted with the 90th selection overall in the third round by the Ottawa Senators in the June 22, 2007 NHL Entry Draft.

As a junior player, he earned a variety of all-star selections. He participated in the 2006 Canadian Junior Hockey League Top Prospects Game, earning Team East MVP honors. In addition, he was selected for the 2007 Ontario Hockey Association Top Prospect Team and the 2007 OPJHL All-Star team. He was also a silver medalist for Team Canada East at the 2006 World Junior A Challenge where he was selected to tournament's all-star team.

College

Caporusso, is described as a left-handed shooting forward by some sources, and he is described as either a left wing or a center by others. However, the Ann Arbor Press described him as a center. The Ottawa Senators have him listed as a centre.

As a freshman at Michigan, he scored 21 points, including 12 goals, in 33 games. That season he missed eight games due to a leg injury. As a sophomore during the 2008–09 season, Caporusso was one of ten finalists for the Hobey Baker Award. During the season, he scored 49 points in 41 games. He was also named to the All-Central Collegiate Hockey Association (CCHA) first-team and AHCA/Reebok Division I Ice Hockey All-American first-team along with teammate Aaron Palushaj. In addition, he was selected to the CCHA All-Conference tournament team. One of the highlights of the season occurred when he scored the first three goals of the game in the first period (the first two within 24 seconds of each other) for the natural hat trick against Michigan Tech on December 27, 2008. During the first half of the season, he led the nation in goals scored. He played a different scoring role during the final nine regular season games, as the team went 8–1 and he scored two goals and posted 14 assists. Caporusso was named the team MVP at the end of the season.

In Caporusso's junior season, he posted 21 goals and 22 assists. Michigan began the season ranked number five in the nation, but Caporusso only scored one goal in his first ten games and had no multigoal games until well into February. Michigan entered the CCHA playoffs with a 19–17–1 record and was on the verge of breaking the team's nineteen consecutive year streak of qualifying for the NCAA Men's Ice Hockey Championship. However, the team won six consecutive games in the conference championship tournament to earn the automatic invitation. Caporusso scored both goals in the final 2–1 victory of the tournament and was named to the All-Tournament team. He also scored in the second period of the first game of the tournament to give Michigan a 2–0 lead. However, Michigan lost in the quarterfinal round in double overtime to the CCHA regular season champion Miami Redhawks.

As a senior, he served as captain of the team. The 2010–11 Michigan Wolverines men's ice hockey team was the 2001–11 CCHA regular season champion. Subsequently, the team finished as runner-up in the 2011 NCAA Division I Men's Ice Hockey Tournament. Caporusso finished second on the team in scoring for the third consecutive season.

Professional
Caporusso signed a two-year entry-level contract with the Senators on May 30, 2011. After attending Ottawa's NHL training camp, He was expected to join the Binghamton Senators to begin his professional career. On October 14, 2011, Caporusso was reassigned to the Elmira Jackals of the ECHL. After scoring 5 points in his first 5 games with Elmira, he was promoted to the Binghamton Senators of the American Hockey League on November 4. After recording zero points in six games with Binghamton, he was reassigned to Elmira on November 17. On November 26, Caporusso was recalled by Binghamton for one game before being returned to Elmira on November 28. Caporusso spent 4 months with the Jackals (missing 6 weeks due to a concussion), scoring 16 goals and 16 assists in 29 games, before being called back up to the Senators on March 15.

At the conclusion of his contract Caporusso's rights were relinquished by the Senators. On August 15, 2013, he signed as a free agent to a one-year contract with reigning champions the Reading Royals of the ECHL.

After parts of two seasons in the Deutsche Eishockey Liga with Augsburger Panther, Caporusso joined fellow German club, Iserlohn Roosters on a one-year contract on June 12, 2015. In the 2016–17 season with the Roosters, his second year in Iserlohn, Caporusso played on the top two scoring lines finishing 3rd in scoring with 29 points in 42 games as Iserlohn finished out of playoff contention. On March 3, 2017, it was announced that Caporusso would not re-new his contract with the club to seek other opportunities in Europe.

On March 6, 2017, Caporusso agreed to a move to Sweden, signing a one-year deal with Brynäs IF of the top tier Swedish Hockey League. He began the 2017–18 season by appearing in only 7 games with Brynäs before opting to terminate his contract with the club and return to Germany with former team, the Iserlohn Roosters, on a two-year deal on November 1, 2017.

Following a season stint with Italian club, Asiago Hockey 1935 of the Alps Hockey League (AlpsHL), Caporusso remained a free agent for the duration of the pandemic affected  season.

On July 28, 2021, Caporusso marked his return to professional hockey in agreeing to a one-year deal in the ECHL with the Cincinnati Cyclones.

Personal 
Born in Toronto, Ontario, Caporusso is from Woodbridge, Ontario. At the University of Michigan, Caporusso was enrolled in the School of Kinesiology and performed public service by visiting the U-M Mott Children's Hospital. Caporusso is a 2007 graduate of the St. Michael's College School in Toronto.
He married his wife, Andrea, in 2016 and together have two daughters. Lyla age 3 and Marlowe age 1.

Career statistics

Awards and honors

References

External links 

 Caporusso archive at AnnArbor.com
Caporusso Michigan bio at mgoblue.com

1989 births
Asiago Hockey 1935 players
Augsburger Panther players
Binghamton Senators players
Brynäs IF players
Canadian ice hockey centres
Cincinnati Cyclones (ECHL) players
Elmira Jackals (ECHL) players
Iserlohn Roosters players
Living people
Michigan Wolverines men's ice hockey players
Ottawa Senators draft picks
Reading Royals players
Ice hockey people from Toronto
Canadian sportspeople of Italian descent
Canadian expatriate ice hockey players in Germany
Canadian expatriate ice hockey players in Sweden
Canadian expatriate ice hockey players in the United States
AHCA Division I men's ice hockey All-Americans